Bridget Shirley, Lady Bengough (née Adams; 4 May 1928 – 18 November 2019) was a British figure skater. She finished seventh at the 1948 Winter Olympics. Adams was coached by Jacques Gerschwiler. She married Sir Piers Bengough in 1952.

Results

References

1928 births
2019 deaths
British female single skaters
Figure skaters at the 1948 Winter Olympics
Olympic figure skaters of Great Britain
Sportspeople from London